Tepebaşı is Turkish word which means "top of the hill" and it may refer to

Tepebaşı, Dicle
Tepebaşı, Eskişehir an intracity district of Eskişehir, Turkey
Tepebaşı, Ermenek a village in Karaman Province
Tepebaşı, Girne, also known as Diorios, a village in Girne district, Cyprus 
Tepebaşı, Göynük, a village in the District of Göynük, Bolu Province, Turkey
Tepebaşı, Hasankeyf, a village in the District of Hasankeyf, Batman Province, Turkey
Tepebaşı, Şavşat, a village in the District of Şavşat, Artvin Province, Turkey
Tepebaşı, Tercan